The Juneau Icefield is an ice field located just north of Juneau, Alaska, continuing north through the border with British Columbia, extending through an area of  in the Coast Range ranging  north to south and  east to west. The icefield is the source of many glaciers including the Mendenhall Glacier and the Taku Glacier. The icefield is home to over 40 large valley glaciers and 100 smaller ones. The icefield, like many of its glaciers, reached its maximum glaciation point around 1700 and has been in retreat since. In fact, of the icefield's 19 notable glaciers, the Taku Glacier is the only one presently advancing. Much of the icefield is contained within the Tongass National Forest. Since 1948, the Juneau Icefield Research Program has monitored glaciers of the Juneau Icefield. Eight kilometers to the north, the Herbert Glacier has retreated , while Eagle Glacier retreated , Gilkey Glacier  and Llewellyn Glacier . On the south side of the icefield, the Norris Glacier retreated , the East Twin Glacier , the West Twin Glacier  with only the Taku Glacier advancing. This glacier was advancing in 1890 when viewed by John Muir and had a large calving front. By 1963 the glacier had advanced . In 1948 the Taku Fjord had been completely filled in with glacial sediment and the glacier no longer calved. From 1948–1986 the glacier had a positive glacier mass balance driving the advance. From 1987–2009 the glacier has had a slightly negative mass balance, not enough to end the advance, but if it continues will soon slow it.

Notable peaks on the Juneau Icefield are Devils Paw, Nelles Peak, Emperor Peak, The Snow Towers, Taku Towers, Camp 15 Peak, and the Mendenhall Towers.

See also
List of glaciers and icefields
Retreat of glaciers since 1850
Ha-Iltzuk Icefield
Homathko Icefield
Lillooet Icecap

Gallery

References

External links
 Terminus Behavior of Juneau Icefield Glaciers 1948-2005
Forest Service overview
Juneau Icefield Research Program
Canadian Mountain Encyclopedia: Juneau Icefield entry
crevassezone.org
Pictures from the Juneau Icefield Research Program
Pulitzer Center Crisis Reporting Juneau Icefield Research (multimedia)
A description of the flora and fauna in the Icefield

Boundary Ranges
Ice fields of Alaska
Ice fields of British Columbia
Glaciers of Juneau, Alaska
Stikine Country
Tourist attractions in Juneau, Alaska
Tongass National Forest